Woodlands Academy of the Sacred Heart (Woodlands, WA, or WASH) is a private, Roman Catholic girls' high school in Lake Forest, Illinois, north of Chicago. Founded by the Society of the Sacred Heart, it is located in the Roman Catholic Archdiocese of Chicago but is run by lay staff with several Sisters sitting on the Board of Trustees.

History
The Convent of the Sacred Heart was established in 1858 by Mother Margaret Crawley RSCJ. In 1860 it moved to its new premises in Taylor Street and was renamed Academy of the Sacred Heart. In 1904, the Sisters moved the school to Lake Forest, Illinois, on the outskirts of Chicago. The now-defunct Barat College was founded in 1918 and the college and academy shared the large "Old Main" building. In 1961 the present name "Woodlands Academy" was adopted following a restructuring of the elementary and secondary schools. Donors later purchased the premises of the former Barat College and donated it to the academy, reuniting the campus with its roots.

Student life

Sports
Woodlands competes in the Independent School League (ISL), and as a member of the Illinois High School Association (IHSA).  WA sponsors volleyball, tennis, field hockey, basketball, soccer, and softball as varsity sports.  The school sponsors golf as a club sport, in addition to being affiliated with North Suburban Crew and the Lake Forest Scouts ice hockey team to permit participation in crew and ice hockey.

Activities
 W.A.C.O.R: Woodlands Academy Council of Representatives.
 Service Club: each advisory (see above definition) elects a member to represent them and report back information pertaining to service.
 H.O.P.E. (Help Others Protect Esteem)
 Campus Ministry
 Spirit Club
 Baking Club
 Poker Club
 Audio Visual Club
 Common Ground
 Japanese Animation Club
 Recycling Awareness Group
 Harry Potter Forum
 La Nouvelle (A literary magazine)
 WAstyle (style magazine)

Traditions
Over the over 150 years of the school's existence, a number of secular and religious traditions have evolved, some of which are unique to Woodlands:

 Congé is a day when classes are cancelled and students spend the rest of the day having fun.  It is often not announced in advance.
 Sacred Heart Awards are awards given to two members of each class and a faculty member at the end of each quarter.  Students submit nominations based on compassion and service.
 Goûter are snacks and other refreshments which are served on special occasions, or as a surprise to students and staff.
 Wildcat of the Week Award is a spirit award given to students who show the most school spirit.  The winner is decided by the student council.
 Cache Cache is a French game of hide and seek played on special days throughout the year.
 Red and White Days are days when students are allowed to dress out of uniform while wearing the school's colors.
 Honors Assemblies are held twice a year to honor academic achievement.
 May Crowning is a traditional Catholic ceremony which honors Mary, by crowning a statue of her with a wreath of flowers.  Students and faculty choose the participants.
 A Ring Ceremony is held every Spring where Juniors are given their school rings by members of the senior class.
 Lambs at the Crib is a Christmas tradition involving the school's crèche scene.  Each student is assigned a figurine of a lamb to place by the scene, and moves it closer to the manger as students complete projects or good works.
 Switch Night is a night when the non-boarding students spend the night at the boarding house.
 Feast of Mater Admirabilis is an October religious celebration which honors Mary, and the sophomore class.
 Mass of the Holy Spirit and Flag Ceremony is a celebration of the school's diversity.  The celebration begins with a procession of students and staff carrying the flags of their homelands to the chapel for mass.  The flags remain in the chapel for the remainder of the year.
 Feast of Saint Rose Philippine Duchesne is celebrated each year to honor the saint who brought the message of Sacred Heart education from France to North America in 1818.

Notable alumnae
 Mary Callahan Erdoes, 1985, banking executive at J.P. Morgan Chase
 Susan Saint James is an actress best known for her work on television (McMillan & Wife, Kate & Allie).
 Jenny Sanford is the former first lady of South Carolina.

See also
 Barat College

References

External links
 Woodlands Academy of the Sacred Heart — official website
 Official Sacred Heart Schools Network page
 The Association of Boarding Schools profile

Educational institutions established in 1858
Lake Forest, Illinois
Roman Catholic Archdiocese of Chicago
Catholic secondary schools in Illinois
Sacred Heart schools in the United States
Girls' schools in Illinois
Schools in Lake County, Illinois
1858 establishments in Illinois
Catholic boarding schools in the United States
Boarding schools in Illinois